Audra Marie Lindley (September 24, 1918 – October 16, 1997) was an American actress, most famous for her role as landlady Helen Roper on the sitcom Three's Company and its spin-off The Ropers.

Life and career
Audra Lindley was born into Los Angeles show business. Her father, Bert Lindley, was a film and stage actor. Lindley got her Hollywood start as a stand-in. This progressed to stunt work, and she eventually became a contract player with Warner Bros.

In 1943, she went to New York in her mid-20s to work in theater. Among her many Broadway plays during her long career were: On Golden Pond, Long Day's Journey into Night, and Horse Heavens. 

After a break from acting to raise five children, she began to make steady appearances on television in the early 1960s, including the role of Sue Knowles on the soap opera Search for Tomorrow, and a five-year stint as manipulative Aunt Liz Matthews on the soap opera Another World. She had regular roles as Meredith Baxter's mother in the sitcom Bridget Loves Bernie as well as Lee Grant’s best friend in Fay. Both series were short-lived.  

In 1971, she starred in Taking Off, the first American film of Miloš Forman. She had guest roles on The Love Boat in 1977, 1978, 1979 and 1981 (pilot movie 3, season 1 episode 4, season 2 episodes 1 & 2, season 3 episodes 1 & 2, season 4 episode 18, and season 5 episode 10).

Her greatest fame came when she began playing the wisecracking, perpetually unfulfilled and sexually frustrated Helen Roper on the hit sitcom Three’s Company (1977–79), in which she wore a wig to maintain her character's exaggerated hairstyle.  The character and her husband Stanley, portrayed by Norman Fell, also starred in the spin-off series The Ropers (1979–80), which ran for two seasons.

She was nominated twice for a Golden Globe Award, in 1973 for her role in Bridget Loves Bernie and in 1979 for her role in Three's Company.

Lindley continued to appear steadily on television and in films, such as Revenge of the Stepford Wives in 1980 and as Fauna, the owner of a brothel in the 1982 film Cannery Row. In 1982, she appeared in the film Best Friends, starring Goldie Hawn and Burt Reynolds.

She played a supporting role in the lesbian-themed film Desert Hearts (1985). In 1987, she had another supporting role as Judith Light's mother in the TV movie Dangerous Affection. She also appeared in 1989's Troop Beverly Hills as outspoken director of the Wilderness Girls. Also in 1989, she was the main character of an episode of the horror anthology series Tales from the Crypt. 

In 1991, she starred in an episode of the horror anthology series The Hidden Room.

In 1995, she played Phoebe Buffay's grandmother, Frances, on Friends.

In 1997, some of her last roles include an episode of Nothing Sacred, the TV movie Sisters and Other Strangers, and the theatrical movie The Relic.

Her final role was as Virginia Sheridan, a recurring part as Cybill Shepherd's character's mother on the sitcom Cybill (having previously also played Shepherd's on-screen mother in the 1972 film The Heartbreak Kid). A later episode of Cybill was dedicated to her.

Personal life and death
She was married to Hardy Ulm, with whom she had five children, from 1943 until his death in 1970. She was then married to actor James Whitmore from 1972 to 1979. 

Lindley died of complications from leukemia on October 16, 1997, at Cedars Sinai Medical Center. She was age 79. She was cremated and her ashes buried in an unmarked grave near her parents at Woodlawn Memorial Cemetery in Santa Monica, California.

Partial filmography

References

External links

 
 
 
 

1918 births
1997 deaths
20th-century American actresses
Actresses from Los Angeles
American television actresses
American soap opera actresses
American stage actresses
Deaths from leukemia
Deaths from cancer in California
Warner Bros. contract players